Sir Johns Run is an unincorporated community hamlet at the mouth of Sir Johns Run on the Potomac River in Morgan County, West Virginia northwest of Berkeley Springs. It is bound to its west by the Widmeyer Wildlife Management Area and to its east by Warm Springs Ridge (1,086 feet). While Sir Johns Run formerly served on the old Baltimore and Ohio Railroad mainline as an early passenger station for Berkeley Springs, today it is primarily a residential community of Berkeley Springs accessible by Sir Johns Run Road (County Route 3). Sir Johns Run had its own post office in operation from 1850 to 1938. Today, the stream and its namesake hamlet are a site on the Washington Heritage Trail.

External links 
Sir John's Run on the Washington Heritage Trail

References

Unincorporated communities in Morgan County, West Virginia
Unincorporated communities in West Virginia
Baltimore and Ohio Railroad
West Virginia populated places on the Potomac River